Ptilonyssus calvaria is a mite that is parasitic in the nasal passages of some birds found in Alberta and Manitoba, Canada.

References

Further reading
Knee, Wayne, Heather Proctor, and Terry Galloway. "Survey of nasal mites (Rhinonyssidae, Ereynetidae, and Turbinoptidae) associated with birds in Alberta and Manitoba, Canada." The Canadian Entomologist 140.03 (2008): 364–379.

Parasites of birds
Ectoparasites
Parasitic acari
Rhinonyssidae
Arthropods of Canada